Suparna Airlines, known in Chinese as Jinpeng, is an airline based in China. It was formerly known as Yangtze River Express and later Yangtze River Airlines after launching passenger services. The company's headquarters are in Shanghai Pudong Development Bank Tower in Pudong, Shanghai.

History

Established on 15 January 2003 as the second cargo airline in the country after China Cargo Airlines, Yangtze River Express was majority owned by the HNA Group (85%) with Hainan Airlines Co (5%) and Shanghai Airport Group (10%) holding the remaining shares. The airline took over the entire cargo operations of Hainan Airlines, China Xinhua Airlines, Chang An Airlines and Shanxi Airlines, all members of the Hainan Air Group.

In 2006, it divested 49% of its shareholdings to a consortium of companies including China Airlines, Yang Ming Marine Transport Corporation, Wan Hai Lines and China Container Express Lines. China Airlines became the largest foreign shareholder with a 25% stake.

The airline rebranded as Suparna Airlines on 7 July 2017; its new name comes from the mythical bird also known as a garuda.

Destinations
Cargo
Yangtze River Express applied for permission to serve Novosibirsk in Russia,  and Los Angeles in USA from summer 2009, pending CAAC approval, they also serve some domestic and Asian routes. From 2010 a Shanghai, Tianjin Binhai International Airport, Prague, Luxembourg, Shanghai, Schiphol Airport round trip route has been operated. As of 2014 there is also a Frankfurt Hahn, Tianjin Binhai International Airport, Shanghai Pudong International Airport connection.
Passenger

On 15 December 2015 Yangtze River Airlines launched domestic passenger flights under its revised name, from Shanghai-Pudong Airport to Guyang, Sanya and Zhuhai using a single Boeing 737-800. Permission was also granted for flights to Hong Kong, Macau and Taiwan.

Fleet

Current fleet

, Suparna Airlines fleet consists of the following aircraft:

Previously operated aircraft

References

External links

Official website 
Hainan Airlines 

Airlines of China
Airlines established in 2003
Cargo airlines of China
Chinese companies established in 2003
Companies based in Shanghai
Chinese brands
HNA Group